The Weser Uplands-Schaumburg-Hamelin Nature Park lies on the northern edge of the German Central Uplands where it transitions to the North German Plain, about  southwest of Hanover. The sponsor of the nature park, which was founded in 1975, is the state of Lower Saxony. The park extends along the  Weser valley between Rinteln and Hamelin and includes parts of the Schaumburg Land, Calenberg, Lippe and Pyrmont Uplands from Bad Nenndorf in the north to Bad Pyrmont in the south, Bückeburg and Bad Eilsen in the west and Bad Münder and Osterwald in the east. Its highest elevation is in the Süntel hills.

Location
Bordered in the north by the forested ridges of the Bückeberg and the Deister, the nature park covers almost  from the eastern Weser Hills, Harrl and Süntel running along both sides of the River Weser southwards to the Ith ridge, the Osterwald and the Thüster Berg, through a very varied landscape of wooded, rolling hills and small valleys with a myriad streams and rivers. In the Süntel, the Ith and on the Kanstein rocky crags tower over the countryside. 
A colourful mix of nature reserves and protected landscapes, towns, several spas and small villages and castles of the Weser Renaissance period mean that the nature park is a popular local recreation and holiday destination in the north German region.

Features

Architecture
Architectural sights in the area include the:
 Weser Renaissance buildings, like the castles of Hämelschenburg and Schwöbber 
 Medieval market place in the former university town of Rinteln 
 Old town centres (Altstädte) of Bückeburg of Hamelin
 Diverse spa towns of Bad Eilsen, Bad Nenndorf, Bad Münder am Deister and Bad Pyrmont
 Numerous early medieval churches, abbeys, convents and town walls

Nature

Notable nature areas include the:
  nature reserve of Hohenstein on the Süntel
  nature reserve of Saubrink/Oberberg Forest
 nature reserve of Weser Hills Crest (Kamm des Wesergebirges)
 very rare, native dwarf beeches (Süntelbuchen)
 Dripstone caves

The most northerly examples of Hartstein rock in Germany occur in the Weser Uplands. As a result, the landscapes and natural regions of the Weser hills are home to numerous quarries belonging to several companies that extract corallian and oolitic Hartstein. These include the Messingsberg near Steinbergen, the Wülpker-Egge near Bückeburg and the Papenbrink near Kleinenbremen in the Weser Hills; as well as the Riesenberg near Langenfeld/Hessisch-Oldendorf and the Mattenberg near Hamelspringe in the Süntel. Schaumburg citizens have founded the Friends of the Weser Uplands and Schaumburg Action Group (Aktionsgemeinschaft Weserbergland - Schaumburger Freunde) to protest the "destruction of the landscape" by the quarry companies.

Leisure activities
 The amusement park Rasti-Land
 Open-air and indoor swimming pools, swimming lakes
 Golf course
 Cycle and footpaths through hills and valleys along the Weser
 Boat trips on the Weser
 Winter sports on the higher hills 
 Rock climbing
 Show caves and mining galleries
 Sommerrodelbahn in Bodenwerder

See also 
 Weser Uplands
 List of nature parks in Germany

External links 
 Website on the nature park 

Weserbergland Schaumburg-Hameln
Protected areas established in 1975
1975 establishments in West Germany